Magic Garden or The Magic Garden may refer to:

Gardens
 The Magic Garden, another name for Secret Buddha Garden on Ko Samui, Thailand
 "The Magic Garden (mosaic)", Isaiah Zagar's largest mosaic in Philadelphia
Philadelphia's Magic Gardens the related project

Other uses
 The Magic Garden, a 1967 album by The 5th Dimension
 The Magic Garden (1927 film), a 1927 film
 The Magic Garden (1951 film), a 1951 film
 The Magic Garden (TV series), an American children's program, on air from 1972 to 1984
 Magic Garden, a game by Enix Japan